State Road 359 (NM 359) is a  state highway in the US state of New Mexico. NM 359's western terminus is at County Route 41 (CR 41) and CR 352 north of Tierra Amarilla, and the eastern terminus is at NM 28 (Avenida de Mesilla) in Mesilla.

Major intersections

See also

References

359
Transportation in Doña Ana County, New Mexico